Gerald John Pappert (born May 15, 1963) is a United States district judge of the United States District Court for the Eastern District of Pennsylvania and former Pennsylvania Attorney General.

Biography

Pappert was born on May 15, 1963, in Albany, New York. He received a Bachelor of Arts degree, cum laude, in 1985 from Villanova University. He received a Juris Doctor in 1988 from the University of Notre Dame Law School. He began his legal career at the law firm of Duane Morris LLP, from 1988 to 1997. He served as the First Deputy Attorney General of Pennsylvania, from 1997 to 2003, and as the Attorney General of Pennsylvania, from 2003 to 2005. He was a partner at Ballard Spahr LLP, from 2005 to 2008. He served as Executive Vice President, General Counsel and Secretary of Cephalon, Inc., from 2008 to 2012. From 2012 to 2014, he was a partner at Cozen O'Connor. He concurrently served as Chair of the Pennsylvania Banking and Securities Commission.

Federal judicial service

On June 16, 2014, President Barack Obama nominated Pappert to serve as a United States District Judge of the United States District Court for the Eastern District of Pennsylvania, to the seat vacated by Judge Stewart Dalzell, who assumed senior status on October 31, 2013. On July 24, 2014 a hearing before the United States Senate Committee on the Judiciary was held on his nomination. On September 18, 2014 his nomination was reported out of committee by a voice vote. On December 1, 2014 Senate Majority Leader Harry Reid filed for cloture on his nomination. On Wednesday December 3, 2014 cloture was invoked by a 67–28 vote. He was later confirmed by a voice vote that same day. He received his judicial commission on December 4, 2014.

References

External links

1963 births
Living people
Judges of the United States District Court for the Eastern District of Pennsylvania
Notre Dame Law School alumni
Pennsylvania Attorneys General
Pennsylvania lawyers
Pennsylvania Republicans
Lawyers from Albany, New York
United States district court judges appointed by Barack Obama
21st-century American judges
Villanova University alumni